Aitor Ramos Leniz (born 11 June 1985) is a Spanish footballer who plays as a forward for Bermeo FT.

Club career
Ramos was born in Bilbao, Biscay. After playing with modest Basque clubs in his early career (although he was part of Athletic Bilbao's youth system from ages 11 to 14), he joined Bilbao Athletic for the 2007–08 season, with the reserves competing in the Segunda División B.

Ramos made his first-team debut on 16 January 2008, coming on as a substitute for Tiko during the 1–1 away draw with RCD Espanyol in the round of 16 of the Copa del Rey. His first La Liga appearance came on the 27th in the home fixture against FC Barcelona (45 minutes played, same result), and he went on to play seven competitive matches throughout the campaign, but was mainly registered for the B side.

In July 2008, Ramos was released by Athletic, joining Écija Balompié in the third tier. Still in the lower leagues, he returned to his native region after just one season, successively representing Barakaldo CF, amateurs CD Laudio and Arenas Club de Getxo.

Ramos returned to his first club Bermeo FT on 5 June 2020 – two decades after leaving – aged 35.

References

External links

1985 births
Living people
Spanish footballers
Footballers from Bilbao
Association football forwards
La Liga players
Segunda División B players
Tercera División players
Divisiones Regionales de Fútbol players
Bermeo FT footballers
SD Lemona footballers
Bilbao Athletic footballers
Athletic Bilbao footballers
Écija Balompié players
Barakaldo CF footballers
CD Laudio players
Arenas Club de Getxo footballers